Regina Sheck (born 9 November 1969) is a former New Zealand rugby union player. She played for the Black Ferns and was a member of the 1998 and 2002 Women's Rugby World Cup squad. In 2012, she was a member of the re-established Waikato women's rugby team that was absent for six years.
She is a Police Officer of Samoan descent.

Sheck played in the two test series against  in 2001.

References

External links
Black Ferns Profile

1969 births
Living people
New Zealand women's international rugby union players
New Zealand female rugby union players
New Zealand sportspeople of Samoan descent